Hybomitra distinguenda is a Palearctic species of horse fly in the family Tabanidae.

References

External links
Images representing Hybomitra distinguenda
Martin C. Harvey , 2018 Key to genus Hybomitra

Tabanidae
Insects described in 1909
Diptera of Europe
Taxa named by George Henry Verrall